The Crooked Creek Bridge is a concrete arch bridge that carries U.S. Route 62 Spur over Crooked Creek in Pyatt, Arkansas. Built in 1923, the bridge was listed on the National Register of Historic Places on January 21, 2010.

History
Although a town site had existed at this bend of Crooked Creek since the 1870s, Pyatt became a town in 1904 upon completion of the St. Louis, Iron Mountain and Southern Railway tracks through the area. As the cotton industry grew in the area and roads began to spring up around Marion County, a connecting road became necessary to give Pyatt access to the main route in the county. Completion of the Crooked Creek Bridge gave Pyatt access to the modern U.S. Route 62 via a spur route.

Design
The closed spandrel arch design became popular during the City Beautiful movement in the 1900s. Concrete became a popular bridge material at the time as well, in an effort to imitate many Roman bridges thought to be beautiful.

See also
National Register of Historic Places listings in Marion County, Arkansas
List of bridges on the National Register of Historic Places in Arkansas

References

External links
 Pyatt Arch Bridge at bridgehunter

Bridges completed in 1923
Transportation in Marion County, Arkansas
Road bridges on the National Register of Historic Places in Arkansas
National Register of Historic Places in Marion County, Arkansas
Concrete bridges in the United States
Arch bridges in the United States
1923 establishments in Arkansas